Take Me Back to Eden is the upcoming third studio album by English rock band Sleep Token. Produced by the band's frontman Vessel1 with Carl Bown, it is due to be released on 19 May 2023 by Spinefarm Records. To date, five songs have been released as singles: "Chokehold", "The Summoning", "Granite", "Aqua Regia" and "Vore".

Background
Sleep Token released the first two songs from their as-yet untitled third album, "Chokehold" and "The Summoning", on 5 and 6 January 2023, respectively. These were followed on 19 and 20 January by "Granite" and "Aqua Regia", respectively. The slew of releases led to a rapid increase in popularity for the band, who grew from having reportedly "less than 300,000 monthly listeners on Spotify at the beginning of January" to having over 1.58 million by the end of the month. "The Summoning", in particular, became one of Sleep Token's most popular songs to date, reaching number 1 on the Spotify Top 50 Viral Songs chart, as well as receiving over 1 million views on YouTube within two weeks. It was also the band's first song to register on the official UK and US charts, reaching number 14 on the UK Rock & Metal Singles Chart, number 26 on the Billboard Hot Rock & Alternative Songs chart, and number 2 on the Billboard Hard Rock Digital Song Sales chart.

Take Me Back to Eden was officially announced on 16 February 2023, alongside the release of fifth single "Vore". The album was described in its announcement as "Part 3 of a trilogy, a spectacular chapter-closer in the ongoing Sleep Token saga, a saga that kicked off in earnest with debut album Sundowning".

Track listing

Personnel
Vessel1 – vocals, guitar, bass, keyboards, synthesisers, production
Vessel2 – drums
Carl Bown – production, engineering

References

2023 albums
Sleep Token albums
Spinefarm Records albums
Upcoming albums